Mobi or MOBI may refer to:

Companies
 Mobi (company), an American wireless provider

Computing
 .mobi, internet top domain name
 .mobi, a file extension of the deprecated Mobipocket e-book format

People
 Mobi Fehr (born 1994), American soccer player
 Mobi Okoli (born 1987), Nigerian football player
 Mobi Oparaku (born 1976), Nigerian former football player

Other uses
 Vancouver Bike Share, a Canadian bicycle sharing system owned by CycleHop that uses the Mobi by Shaw Go brand
 Fiat Mobi, a 2016–present Brazilian-Italian city car

See also
 Moby (disambiguation)